Bidar – Kolhapur Shri Chhatrapati Shahu Maharaj Terminus Express was  an Weekly Express Train which ran Between  Bidar & Kolhapur section which comes under the South Central Railway zone & Central Railway zone in Karnataka & Maharashtra State in India. This train has been permanently cancelled in ZBTT.

Overview
This train was inaugurated on 8 June 2018, Flagged off by Dhananjay Mahadik an MP of Kolhapur with Central Railway for Direct connectivity between Southern parts of Maharashtra and Northern part of Karnataka. Inaugurated as weekly special train after 20 June 2018, due to the huge Demand for this route its converted into regular weekly train service.

Routes

Traction
As this route is not electrified so WDM 3A pulled  the train on both directions.

References

Express trains in India
Transport in Kolhapur
Transport in Bidar
Rail transport in Karnataka
Rail transport in Maharashtra